Hyun-sik is a Korean masculine given name. Its meaning depends on the hanja used to write each syllable of the name. There are 35 hanja with the reading "hyun" and 16 hanja with the reading "sik" on the South Korean government's official list of hanja which may be registered for use in given names.
 
People with this name include:
Im Hyun-sik (born 1945), South Korean actor
Min Hyun-sik (born 1946), South Korean male architect
Jo Hyun-sik (born 1983), South Korean actor
Ahn Hyun-sik (born 1987), South Korean male football player
Im Hyun-sik (singer) (born 1992), South Korean singer and member of boy band BtoB
Lee Hyeon-sik, South Korean male handball player, represented South Korea in Handball at the 2014 Asian Games – Men

Fictional characters with this name include:
Hyun-shik, male character played by Kim Yu-seok in 2000 South Korean film The Isle 
Jung Hyun-sik, real name of Lee Doo-seok, in 2012 South Korean film Confession of Murder

References

Korean masculine given names